The Wales national rugby league team represents the nation of Wales in international rugby league, and is governed by Wales Rugby League (Welsh: Rygbi Cynghrair Cymru). The team played its first official match in 1908. Since then, more than 500 players have made at least one international appearance for the team.

This list includes all the players who have represented the Welsh national team.

Players

See also

List of Great Britain national rugby league team players
Wales national rugby league team match results
 Wales A

Sources 
 Wales players stats and details

References

External links
 Players 1-250
(archived by web.archive.org) Players 251-500

 Wales
 
Wales